Bruce Mann may refer to:

 Bruce Mann (civil servant), British civil servant
 Bruce Mann (oncologist), surgical oncologist
 Bruce Mann (rugby league) (1926–2007), rugby league footballer
 Bruce H. Mann (born 1950), Harvard Law School professor and legal historian

See also
 Bruce Douglas-Mann (1927–2000), British politician